Welz is a surname of German origin. Notable people with the name include:

 Emil Welz (born 1879), German track and field athlete
 Gerhard Welz (born 1945), German footballer
 Giuseppe De Welz (1774–1841), Italian economist
 Jean Welz (1908–1975), South African artist
 Joey Welz (born 1940), American musician, pianist with Bill Haley and His Comets
 Larry Welz (born 1948), American cartoonist
 Martin Welz, South African journalist
 Peter Welz (born 1972), German artist
 Robert von Welz (1814–1878), German physician and ophthalmologist
 Tobias Welz (born 1977), German football referee
 Thomas Welz (born 1957) East German dissident

References

See also
 Wells (name)

German-language surnames